Weatherson is a surname. Notable people with the surname include:

 Brian Weatherson, Professor of Philosophy at the University of Michigan
 Peter Weatherson (born 1980), English footballer

See also
 Weatherston